Bobbili Brahmanna  is a 1984 Telugu-language action drama film directed by K. Raghavendra Rao. It was produced by U. Suryanarayana Raju for the studio Gopi Krishna Movies. The film stars Krishnam Raju, Sharada, and Jayasudha as lead actors, and is scored by K. Chakravarthy. The film was blockbuster hit at the box office. The film won three Nandi Awards and one Filmfare Award South.

Plot
Brahmanna is the head of Kotipalli, a village which does not have the police force. He is a descendant of the Bobbili clan, through which he has gained the role of a mediator between people in the village. He makes impartial judgements before the table of justice—a massive tree trunk adorned with a sacred sword.

Brahmanna's younger brother, Ravi, falls in love with a woman named Kasturi. One day, a man named Bullebbayi rapes Kasturi's older sister, Swaraiyam, in a graveyard. Ravi intercedes and saves Swaraiyim. He brings her to the table of justice. Brahmanna decides that Bellebbayi should marry Swaraiyam. Bellebbayi's father, Rayudu, is plotting to occupy the chair of the village head. Later, Rayudu performs a dangerous abortion on his now-pregnant daughter-in-law. Rayudu also starts a rumor that Brahmanna is having an affair with a woman named Susheela and that he sleeps in her hut on the outskirts of the village. Brahmanna reveals that Susheela is the widow of a man he wrongfully condemned to death, and he is now looking after her out of remorse.

Brahmanna's daughter, Rajeswari, falls in love with Susheela's son, Rambabu. Brahmanna agrees to the couple's marriage. Rajeswari goes to play with a swing in a fit of happiness. Rayudu causes Rajeswari to fall from the swing. She falls on a man, and Rayudu claims that the impact blinded that man. Brahmanna's tries to do justice even if the perpetrator is his family member, and he decides that Rajeswari now must marry the blind man to do penance. Ignoring this judgment, Ravi performs a secret marriage between Rajeswari and Rambabu. In anger, Brahmanna expels Ravi from the village. Susheela finds out Rayudu's plan to overthrow Brahmanna. She informs Brahmanna of this, and he slays Rayudu with the sword from the table of justice. Ending the village's autonomy, the film ends with the police arriving and arresting Brahmanna for Rayudu's murder.

Cast
Krishnam Raju as Brahmanna / Ravi (Dual role)
 Sharada as Savitri
Jayasudha as Kasturi
Rao Gopal Rao as Meesala Pedavenkatrayudu
Satyanarayana as Bullebbayi
Allu Ramalingaiah
Nutan Prasad as Shastri
Sarathi
Rajesh as Rambabu
Annapoorna as Susheelamma
Mucherla Aruna as Rajeswari
Krishnaveni as Swarajyam

Awards 
Filmfare Awards
 Best Actor - Krishnam Raju

Nandi Awards - 1984
 Best Actor - Krishnam Raju
 Best Supporting Actress - Sharada
 Best Director - K. Raghavendra Rao

Remake
Krishnam Raju remade the film in Hindi as Dharm Adhikari under Gopi Krishna Movies in 1986 starring Dilip Kumar, Jeetendra, and Sridevi. In Bobbili Brahmanna, Krishnam Raju played both the lead roles, but in Dharm Adhikari, the two roles are played by Dilip Kumar and Jeetendra. It was also remade in Kannada as "Dharmapeetha", starring Shrinath and Shashikumar in lead roles.

Legacy
The film's concept of a hero judging others' problems in his village became very popular. Later, the formula was used in Cheran Pandiyan (1991) (Tamil film, remade in Telugu as Balarama Krishnulu in 1992), Chinna Gounder (1992) (Tamil film, remade in Telugu as Chinarayudu in 1992), Bobbili Simham (1994), Nattamai (1994) (Tamil film, remade in Telugu as Pedarayudu in 1995), Kondapalli Rattaiah (1995) and Kondaveeti Simhasanam (2002).

References

External links
 

1984 films
1980s Telugu-language films
Films directed by K. Raghavendra Rao
Films produced by Krishnam Raju
Films scored by K. Chakravarthy
Indian action drama films
1980s action drama films
Telugu films remade in other languages
Films with screenplays by the Paruchuri brothers